The Toporzeł is an emblem, created by Stanisław Szukalski in 1935, as Polish nationalist symbol, used by racist and antisemitic groups. It was created by combination of axe and eagle. The head has the form of a hook, which symbolizes breaking a tradition. 
       
"Therefore, I am bringing you a beautiful sign, a new Eagle, even simpler than the Piast, so that you, who are possessed, are also you, the intention of the mission of the Rodoslawi; with an open heart they adopted on their banners, a sincere confession of national and racial patriotism, this is the sign of Topor, which became the Eagle. Let the Axor give us all, regardless of the different paths of attaining to the same Ideal, inspiration is needed today “ - S.Szukalski

The emblem with an added cross, called "Topokrzyż", was seen in Krak magazine, published by Szukalski. It contains the inscription "GOJ - Gospodarczą Organizujmy Jedność" (sounding like "Goy" and means "Organize Economic Unity"), and was intended to mark non-Jewish shops.

References 

Antisemitism in Poland
National symbols of Poland
Nationalist symbols